The Weigandt Barn is a historic barn at 27285 Silver Valley Road in rural Jones County, South Dakota.  It is a rectangular structure on a fieldstone and concrete foundation, and measures .  Built in 1917 by August Weigandt, it is a regionally unusual example of a Western Feeder barn, a type not usually found in the West River (western half) of the state.  Farmers in the area generally "finished" their cattle on grass, and did not need feeder barns.

The barn was listed on the National Register of Historic Places in 1995.

Gallery

See also
National Register of Historic Places listings in Jones County, South Dakota

References

Barns on the National Register of Historic Places in South Dakota
Buildings and structures in Jones County, South Dakota
Infrastructure completed in 1918
Round barns in South Dakota
National Register of Historic Places in Jones County, South Dakota